The Democratic Socialist Party of Greece ( Demokratiko Sosialistiko Komma Ellados) was a  political party founded by George Papandreou in 1935. It took part in the 1946 elections, but was unsuccessful. The party split from the Liberal Party. It was replaced in 1950 with the formation of the Georgios Papandreou Party.

Political parties established in 1935
Social democratic parties in Greece
Liberal parties in Greece
Defunct political parties in Greece
Georgios Papandreou
1935 establishments in Greece
Political parties disestablished in 1950
Radical parties
1950 disestablishments in Greece